Hellion is an immersive space survival simulation game developed by Serbian studio Zero Gravity Games. It was released into the Steam Early Access program in February 2017. The game allows players to maneuver through environments and open space in the absence of gravity as well as move about the interiors of spaceships or stations with or without artificial gravity. As a first-person game, players must manage their resources in the interest of their survival, discover other resources and space station modules which can be salvaged and assembled into larger more complex stations.

On October 15, 2019, development on Hellion was suspended. On October 21, 2019, the game was officially released, version 0.5.2, and on April 1, 2020, it was removed from Steam.

Gameplay 
Broadly set in a zero-gravity environment, player and spacecraft movement in the game follows the traditional Newtonian physical vectors while stations adhere to orbital mechanics. Players may define and travel into orbits around planetary bodies and other large naturally occurring astronomical phenomena. The player begins the game in a derelict de-orbiting space station equipped with only a bottle of oxygen and a jet pack for maneuvering.

As a multiplayer game, Hellion challenges players to collect and safeguard resources and assets from destruction and potential capture by other players since players may attack and claim their assets.  The single-player aspect of the game focuses the player on the in-game story and space station expansion. In both modes, the player must perform ship or station repairs which involve resources which must be discovered and accumulated from within the fictional universe. As non-upgraded equipment deteriorates significantly faster than upgraded elements, this becomes a repeating process with progressive sustainability. Ultimately the player is free to explore and discover the fate of Hellion or achieve a notion of champion status among other players.

Decommissioning 

During the final 3 days of its presence on Steam, ZeroGravity made the game available to own by Steam users for free. For a brief period on March 31, the price returned to its previous usual price and then was removed from the online Steam Store at midnight, GMT.

On March 28, 2021, the previous Community Manager for Zero Gravity announced that the official Multiplayer Servers for the game had shut down. However, this did not include the Main Server, which is necessary for clients to be able to connect to Community hosted servers.

Owners of licensed copies of Hellion will continue to be able to play the game via Steam.

References

External links 
 Official Website  (Now offline, archived)
 Zero Gravity Games (Now offline, archived)

Windows games
Space opera video games
Space flight simulator games
2019 video games
Windows-only games
Video games developed in Serbia
Video games set in outer space
Video games with 6 degrees of freedom
Multiplayer and single-player video games